Distichia is a genus of plants in the family Juncaceae described as a genus in 1843.

The genus is native to South America.

 species
 Distichia acicularis Balslev & Laegaard - Ecuador
 Distichia filamentosa Buchenau - Peru, Bolivia, N Chile
 Distichia muscoides Nees & Meyen - Colombia, Ecuador, Peru, Bolivia, NW Argentina

References

Juncaceae
Poales genera
Taxa named by Christian Gottfried Daniel Nees von Esenbeck